The Hale Observatories are observatories set up by George Ellery Hale, including:

 Mount Wilson Observatory, in Los Angeles County, California
 Palomar Observatory, in San Diego County, California
 Yerkes Observatory, in Williams Bay, Wisconsin

See also
 Hale Solar Laboratory, in Pasadena, California